This article includes a list of countries of the world sorted by received Foreign direct investment (FDI) stock, the level of accumulated FDI in a country during the past years. The US dollar estimates presented here are calculated at market or government official exchange rates.

2006

This is a list of countries by FDI in 2006 mostly based on CIA Factbook accessed in January 2008.

See also
Complete list		

received FDI in the past
Foreign direct investment
Inward investment